Bogdan Kramer (born 18 April 1944) is a Polish sailor. He competed in the Tornado event at the 1980 Summer Olympics.

References

External links
 

1944 births
Living people
Polish male sailors (sport)
Olympic sailors of Poland
Sailors at the 1980 Summer Olympics – Tornado
People from Poznań County
Sportspeople from Greater Poland Voivodeship